Edouard Mondron (born 6 September 1986) is a Belgian racing driver currently competing in the TCR International Series and TCR Benelux Touring Car Championship. Having previously competed in the Formula Renault 1.6 Belgium and Belgian Racing Car Championship amongst others.

Racing career
Mondron began his career in 2006 in the Formula Renault 1.6 Belgium. He switched to the Belgian Touring Car Series for 2010. He continued there for 2011, finishing his second season in the series, second in the championship standings. For 2012 he made his Blancpain Endurance Series debut, starting the season in the Pro Cup, he switched to the Pro-Am Cup midway through the season. He finished the season twenty-second in the Pro Cup standings and twenty-third in the Pro-Am Cup standings. In 2013 he switched to the Belgian Racing Car Championship. In 2016 he made the switch to the TCR Benelux Touring Car Championship, teaming up with his brother Guillaume. The pair finished the season eighth in the standings after one victory and three podiums. The pair returned to the series again in 2017, taking a victory in first qualifying race of the season at Spa-Francorchamps.

In April 2017 it was announced that he would race in the TCR International Series, driving a Volkswagen Golf GTI TCR for Delahaye Racing.

Racing achievements

Complete TCR International Series results
(key) (Races in bold indicate pole position) (Races in italics indicate fastest lap)

References

External links
 

1986 births
Racing drivers from Brussels
Living people
TCR International Series drivers
Belgian racing drivers
Blancpain Endurance Series drivers
Belgian Formula Renault 1.6 drivers
21st-century Belgian people
Boutsen Ginion Racing drivers
TCR Europe Touring Car Series drivers